Founded in Boston in 1992, IDG Capital is an investment and asset management firm that specializes in venture capital, private equity, and mergers & acquisitions. The firm currently has offices in fifteen cities around the world, including New York, Boston, London, Beijing, Shanghai, Hong Kong, Seoul and Hanoi.

The firm was the first global investment firm to enter China in the 1990s and an early investor of Baidu, Tencent, Xiaomi, Meituan, and Qihoo 360.

In January 2017, IDG Capital and China Oceanwide Holdings Group acquired International Data Group (IDG) and its subsidiaries, International Data Corporation (IDC), IDG Communications, and IDG Ventures. IDG Capital became the controlling shareholder of IDG Ventures.

In March 2017, IDG Capital completed the acquisition of a 20 per cent stake in French Ligue 1 football club Olympique Lyonnais for €100m (US$105.38m).

In 2019, Hurun Report has noted, IDG Capital is among the top three investors in Chinese unicorns, with 25 current listed portfolio companies now valued at more than US$1 billion.

References 

Financial services companies established in 1992
Venture capital firms of the United States